Great Continental Railway Journeys is a British television documentary series presented by Michael Portillo. In the early series, Portillo explores the railway networks of continental Europe, but in later series he also ventured further afield. He refers to a 1913 copy of Bradshaw's Continental Railway Guide, as he describes how the places he visits have changed since Edwardian times. The first series was originally broadcast on BBC Two in 2012, and the seventh series was first aired in 2020. Series 8 was filmed in Spring and Summer 2022

Series overview

Episodes

Series 1 (2012)

The first series was originally broadcast on BBC Two in 2012. Portillo made five separate journeys across France, Germany, the Low Countries, Switzerland, and the countries whose land made up the former Austro-Hungarian Empire.

Series 2 (2013)

Production of a second series included filming in Spain and Gibraltar in May and June 2013, following the Ronda–Algeciras railway line, built in the 1890s by British interests under the Algeciras Gibraltar Railway Company, for the benefit of British officers stationed in Gibraltar wanting to travel to Spain and the rest of Europe. To avoid offending Spanish sensitivities, the line was built concluding in Algeciras, a town in Spain on the opposite side of the Bay of Gibraltar, rather than at the Gibraltar border. Despite it having no direct connection to the European railway network, a chapter was devoted to Gibraltar in the 1913 guidebook.

Series 3 (2014)

The third series had six journeys, in one of which Portillo went further afield to travel on the railways in modern-day Israel.

Series 4 (2015)

The fourth series aired in 2015. It took Portillo to Bulgaria, Turkey, Austria, Italy, Slovenia, Greece, Germany, and Spain.

Series 5 (2016)

Series 6 (2018)

Series 7 (2020)

DVD releases
As of 2021, series 1-6 of Great Continental Railway Journeys have been released on DVD by FremantleMedia under licence from Boundless and the BBC.

Books
Great Continental Railway Journeys, written by Michael Portillo, was published by  Simon & Schuster UK in October 2015.

References

External links

Article by Michael Portillo - 25 Oct 2013 at The Telegraph

2012 British television series debuts
2010s British documentary television series
2010s British travel television series
2020s British documentary television series
2020s British travel television series
BBC television documentaries
BBC travel television series
Documentary television series about railway transport
English-language television shows
Television series by Fremantle (company)
Television shows set in Austria
Television shows set in Belgium
Television shows set in Bulgaria
Television shows set in the Czech Republic
Television shows set in Denmark
Television shows set in England
Television shows set in France
Television shows set in Germany
Television shows set in Greece
Television shows set in Hungary
Television shows set in Israel
Television shows set in Italy
Television shows set in London
Television shows set in the Netherlands
Television shows set in Norway
Television shows set in Poland
Television shows set in Portugal
Television shows set in Russia
Television shows set in Slovenia
Television shows set in Spain
Television shows set in Sweden
Television shows set in Switzerland
Television shows set in Turkey